Rádio Top 100 Oficiální is the official chart of the top ranking songs as based on airplay in the Czech Republic, compiled and published weekly by IFPI Czech Republic.

Below is the list of songs that have reached number one on the Rádio Top 100 Oficiální during the 2020s.

Number-one songs

See also
 2020s in music

References

Czech Republic Songs
2020s